Ultimate Medical Academy (UMA) is a nonprofit career education school that grants associate degrees and training in the allied health field. The institution also provides continuing medical education (CME) to more than 30,000 physicians, nurses and other medical professionals annually.

UMA is institutionally accredited by the Accrediting Bureau of Health Education Schools.

As of July 2021, UMA has more than 69,000 alumni and more than 10,000 students nationwide.

History
Ultimate Medical Academy began operating in Clearwater, FL in 1993 as Ultimate Learning Center, Inc.

In January 2005, the school was acquired by Ultimate Medical Academy, LLC and expanded its program offerings, including the launch of online programs in 2009.

In March 2015, Clinical and Patient Educators Association (CPEA), a 501 (c)(3) nonprofit organization, acquired UMA.

Thomas Rametta is the President of UMA, a role he assumed in October 2019 after serving as CFO.

In July 2021, UMA signed an articulation agreement with Florida A&M University (FAMU) whereby UMA alumni may apply qualifying transfer credits directly toward the attainment of their bachelor’s degree at FAMU.

Academics
Current courses offered include:

Online Campus

Associate Degree Programs
 Healthcare Accounting  
 Health and Human Services 
 Health Information Management 
 Healthcare Management 
 Medical Billing and Coding 
 Health Sciences:  
 Medical Administrative Assistant 
 Medical Office and Billing Specialist 
 Pharmacy Technician

Diploma Programs
 Medical Administrative Assistant
 Medical Billing and Coding
 Medical Office and Billing Specialist

Clearwater, Florida Campus

Associate Degree Programs
 Dental Assistant with Expanded Functions
 Medical Assistant

Diploma Programs
 Dental Assistant with Expanded Functions
 Medical Assistant
 Nursing Assistant
 Patient Care Technician
 Phlebotomy Technician

Continuing Medical Education
UMA is accredited by the Accreditation Council for Continuing Medical Education to provide continuing medical education. UMA’s CME centers include Littleton, Colorado-based Global Education Group and Miami-based Complete Conference Management.

References

External links 
 

Nursing schools in Florida
Private universities and colleges in Florida